HRTV may refer to:

 Harvard-Radcliffe Television (now Harvard Undergraduate Television), a Harvard University student-run television organization
 The Heartland virus, a virus under the Bhanja virus serocomplex, under Phlebovirus
 High-definition television (HDTV), via the incorrect nomenclature "high-resolution television"
 Horse Racing TV, a television network dedicated to horse sports